Shabbir Khan (born 31 March 1997) is an Indian cricketer. He made his first-class debut on 3 January 2020, for Bihar in the 2019–20 Ranji Trophy. He made his List A debut on 20 February 2021, for Bihar in the 2020–21 Vijay Hazare Trophy.

References

External links
 

1997 births
Living people
Indian cricketers
Bihar cricketers
Place of birth missing (living people)